Taylor Emery (born August 26, 1997) is an American professional basketball player.

Early years
Born in Bremerton, Washington, the daughter of Emmett Emery and Michelle Griffin, Emery has three siblings and attended Freedom High School in Tampa, Florida. She was a member of the National Honors Society, the National Science Honors Society, and Mu Alpha Theta for honors in mathematics.

Emery began her college career at Tulane University, followed by one season at Gulf Coast State College and then played for Virginia Tech. She majored in creative writing, writes poetry, and plans to become a veterinarian.

College career
Emery began her college career at Tulane University, where she averaged 6.2 points in 2015–16. She made the American Athletic Conference’s all-freshman team. She transferred to Gulf Coast State College after the season where she went on to averaged 19 points per game, leading her team to the National Junior College Athletic Association Division I crown. In 2017 she moved again, this time to Virginia Tech where she finished here college career in 2019, averaging 18.7 points for her senior season and being named Second Team All-ACC.

Tulane and Virginia Tech statistics

Source

Professional career
After going undrafted in the 2019 WNBA Draft, Emery was signed by the Minnesota Lynx in April 2019. She was waived by the Lynx in May the same year after appearing in one preseason game where she scored 2 points.

Notes

External links
WNBA Player Profile

Living people
American women's basketball players
Basketball players from Tampa, Florida
Tulane Green Wave women's basketball players
1997 births
Guards (basketball)
Gulf Coast State College alumni
Virginia Tech Hokies women's basketball players